Doerun is a city in Colquitt County, Georgia, United States. The population was 774 at the 2010 census.

History
A post office called Doerun has been in operation since 1895. The Georgia General Assembly incorporated the place in 1899 as the "Town of Doerun". The community was named for a deer run near the original town site.

Geography
Doerun is located at  (31.320046, -83.916675).

Demographics

As of the census of 2000, there were 828 people, 343 households, and 221 families residing in the city. The racial makeup of the city was 54.11% White, 43.48% African American, 0.24% Native American, 0.85% from other races, and 1.33% from two or more races. Hispanic or Latino of any race were 1.45% of the population.

There were 343 households, out of which 29.7% had children under the age of 18 living with them, 42.9% were married couples living together, 17.8% had a female householder with no husband present, and 35.3% were non-families. 32.1% of all households were made up of individuals, and 18.4% had someone living alone who was 65 years of age or older.  The average household size was 2.41 and the average family size was 3.06.

In the city, the population was spread out, with 27.4% under the age of 18, 6.5% from 18 to 24, 25.6% from 25 to 44, 22.0% from 45 to 64, and 18.5% who were 65 years of age or older.  The median age was 38 years. For every 100 females, there were 87.8 males.  For every 100 females age 18 and over, there were 78.3 males.

The median income for a household in the city was $25,577, and the median income for a family was $35,278. Males had a median income of $28,125 versus $21,250 for females. The per capita income for the city was $16,627.  About 19.8% of families and 26.6% of the population were below the poverty line, including 45.9% of those under age 18 and 19.7% of those age 65 or over.

Education

Doerun Elementary School (DES) is located within the city limits of Doerun.  DES is administered by the Colquitt County School District. Doerun is also served by Colquitt County High School. Principal is Mrs. Kati Stephan, a former teacher of Doerun Elementary.

References

Cities in Georgia (U.S. state)
Cities in Colquitt County, Georgia